Oxera baladica is a species of flowering plant in the family Lamiaceae. It comprises two subspecies, both of which are included as vulnerable species on the IUCN Red List:
Oxera baladica subsp. baladica (formerly Oxera cauliflora)
Oxera baladica subsp. nuda (formerly Oxera nuda)

References

Lamiaceae
Flora of New Caledonia
Plants described in 1863